Sofía Sara Hübner Bezanilla (born 18 December 1888; date of death unknown), also known as Sara Hübner de Fresno and by her literary pseudonym Magda Sudermann, was a Chilean feminist writer, journalist, and editor.

The daughter of the writer Carlos Luis Hübner and Teresa Bezanilla, Sara Hübner de Fresno wrote for newspapers and magazines, including , Sucesos, and Artes y letras. She also edited the Women's Page section of the periodical Las Últimas Noticias in the early 20th century.

Part of her literary output is known to be unpublished or scattered in newspapers and magazines – as is also the case with other feminist writers such as Luisa Lynch, María Luisa Fernández, and the sisters Ximena and Carmen Morla Lynch. Her literary work is considered to be part of the early 20th century avant-garde that sought to increase feminist thinking and fight for women's rights. However some of her writings express feelings of contempt toward the Mapuche people.

Works
 "Del diario íntimo de Magda Suddermann" in Revista de artes y letras (Santiago: Ediciones de Artes y Letras, 1918)
 "Nunca" in Hablemos de amor: Gran selección de poemas románticos de los genios del amor (1960)

References

External links
 "Del diario íntimo de Magda Suddermann" at Memoria Chilena

1888 births
Year of death missing
Chilean editors
Chilean women editors
Chilean journalists
Chilean people of German descent
Chilean women journalists
Writers from Santiago
Women's page journalists
Chilean feminist writers
20th-century pseudonymous writers
Pseudonymous women writers